Norol Azali bin Sulaiman is a Malaysian politician and has served as Pahang State Executive Councillor.

Election Results

Honours
  :
  Knight Companion of the Order of the Crown of Pahang (DIMP) – Dato' (2013)
  Grand Knight of the Order of Sultan Ahmad Shah of Pahang (SSAP) – Dato' Sri (2017)

References

United Malays National Organisation politicians
Members of the Pahang State Legislative Assembly
Pahang state executive councillors
21st-century Malaysian politicians
Living people
Year of birth missing (living people)

People from Pahang
Malaysian people of Malay descent
Malaysian Muslims